Czech may refer to:
 Anything from or related to the Czech Republic, a country in Europe
 Czech language
 Czechs, the people of the area
 Czech culture
 Czech cuisine
 One of three mythical brothers, Lech, Czech, and Rus'

Places
Czech, Łódź Voivodeship, Poland
Czechville, Wisconsin, unincorporated community, United States

People 

 Bronisław Czech (1908–1944), Polish sportsman and artist
 Danuta Czech (1922–2004), Polish Holocaust historian
 Hermann Czech (born 1936), Austrian architect
 Mirosław Czech (born 1968), Polish politician and journalist of Ukrainian origin
 Zbigniew Czech (born 1970), Polish diplomat

See also 
 Čech, a surname
 Czech lands
 Czechoslovakia
 List of Czechs
 
 
 Czechoslovak (disambiguation)
 Czech Republic (disambiguation)
 Czechia (disambiguation)

Language and nationality disambiguation pages